François Lefebvre de Laboulaye (16 June 1917 – 28 August 1996) was a French diplomat. He was French Ambassador to Brazil from 1968 to 1972, to Japan from 1973 to 1975 and to the United States from 1977 to 1981.

Life 
Laboulaye was born in Washington in a family of diplomats, he is the son of  André Lefebvre de La Boulaye, French Ambassador to the United States, and Marie Hély d'Oissel. 

A law graduate and a graduate of Sciences Po, attracted by diplomacy, he was first at the Red Cross' disposal, where he was Deputy Director General. He later became one of the main collaborators of the  haut-commissaire de France à Beyrouth.

After a period in Berlin and at the Quai d'Orsay in the sub-directorate of the Levant, he was appointed Embassy Counsellor in Ottawa and then in Washington in 1954.

Upon his return to France, he was in charge of missions at the General Directorate of the Compagnie française des pétroles and then at the Political Affairs Directorate at the ministère des Affaires étrangères. 

First Embassy Counsellor in Moscow from 1962 to 1965, he became Ambassador to Brazil (1968 to 1972) and Japan (1973 to 1975).

From 1977 to 1981 he was appointed Ambassador to Washington, where he succeeded Jacques Kosciusko-Morizet, and was elevated to the rank of French Ambassador on 27 September 1978.

A street in the city of Saint-Saëns, Seine-Maritime where he died at age 79 bears his name.

Distinctions 
 Commandeur of the Legion of Honour
 Commandeur of the Ordre national du Mérite
 Order of the Rising Sun (1st class) 
  Grand Cross of the Order of the Southern Cross
 Associated member of the Académie des sciences, belles-lettres et arts de Rouen

References

External links 
 Ambassadeurs de France aux États-Unis depuis 1893, on the website of the French embassy in Washington.

1917 births
1996 deaths
People from Washington, D.C.
Sciences Po alumni
20th-century French diplomats
Ambassadors of France to Japan
Ambassadors of France to Brazil
Ambassadors of France to the United States
Commandeurs of the Légion d'honneur
Commanders of the Ordre national du Mérite
Grand Cordons of the Order of the Rising Sun